Snowmageddon, Snowpocalypse, and Snowzilla are portmanteaus of the word "snow" with "Armageddon", "Apocalypse", and "Godzilla" respectively. Snowmageddon and Snowpocalypse were used in the popular press in Canada during January 2009, and was also used in January 2010 by The Guardian reporter Charlie Brooker to characterise the sensationalist reaction of television news to a period of snowfall across the UK. The Washington Post, out of Washington, D.C., ran an online poll asking for reader feedback prior to the February 5–6, 2010 North American blizzard  on February 4, 2010, and several blogs, including the Washington Posts own blog, followed that up by using either "Snowmageddon" or "Snowpocalypse" before, during, and after the storm hit.

The Washington Post also popularized the term "kaisersnoze" (see Keyser Söze) in response to the February snowstorms.

During the evening preceding the first blizzard hitting Washington, D.C., most of the United States federal government closed, and press coverage continued to characterize the storm using either "Snowmageddon", "Snowpocalypse", or both.

The term "Snowpocalypse" was used in the Pacific Northwest to refer to a snowstorm in December 2008.

The 2008 children's book Winter Blast by Chris Wright, uses the term "snowmageddon" in the storyline of the book.

Examples
The Great Blizzard of '93
North American blizzard of 2009 (Snowpocalypse)   
February 5–6, 2010 North American blizzard (Snowmageddon)
February 9–10, 2010 North American blizzard (Snowmageddon: Snoverkill)
February 25–27, 2010 North American blizzard (Snowicane)
December 2010 North American blizzard
January 31 – February 2, 2011 North American blizzard
February 2013 nor'easter
Early 2014 North American cold wave
November 13 – 21, 2014 North American winter storm
January 2016 United States blizzard (Snowzilla)
Winter of 2009–2010 in the United Kingdom
Winter of 2010–2011 in the United Kingdom
January 17, 2020 in St. John's, Canada blizzard (Snowmageddon)
February 13–17, 2021 North American winter storm

See also

1993 Storm of the Century
1991 Perfect Storm
Hurricane Sandy
Perfect storm
Superstorm
White Juan

References 

2000s neologisms
Popular culture neologisms
Winter weather events